Ivo Luís Knoll (15 August 1929 – 15 May 2021) was a Brazilian politician.

References

1929 births
2021 deaths
20th-century Brazilian politicians
Members of the Legislative Assembly of Santa Catarina
People from Santa Catarina (state)